Eye for an Eye is the first studio album by American heavy metal band Corrosion of Conformity, released in 1984. CD releases have had the entire Six Songs with Mike Singing EP included as bonus tracks.

Track listing
All songs written by Mike Dean, Woody Weatherman and Reed Mullin, except "Green Manalishi".
 "Tell Me" – 3:29
 "Minds Are Controlled" – 1:35
 "Indifferent" – 1:18
 "Broken Will" – 1:34
 "Rabid Dogs" – 0:40
 "L.S." – 2:15
 "Rednekkk" – 1:19
 "Coexist" – 2:51
 "Excluded" – 1:13
 "Dark Thoughts" – 1:50
 "Poison Planet" – 1:27
 "What?" – 2:32
 "Negative Outlook" – 0:53
 "Positive Outlook" – 2:13
 "No Drunk" – 0:24
 "College Town" – 2:05
 "Not Safe" – 2:31
 "Eye for an Eye" – 1:20
 "Nothing's Gonna Change" – 1:12
 "Green Manalishi" (written by Peter Green and Fleetwood Mac) – 2:56

Six Songs with Mike Singing EP (1985 recordings)
 "Eye for an Eye" – 1:14
 "Center of the World" – 0:29
 "Citizen" – 0:49
 "Not for Me" – 1:08
 "What?" – 2:26
 "Negative Outlook" – 0:55

Personnel
Eric Eycke – vocals (tracks 1–20)
Mike Dean – bass (all tracks), vocals (tracks 21–26)
Woody Weatherman – guitars
Reed Mullin – drums
David Mahon – engineering

References

1984 debut albums
Corrosion of Conformity albums